André Pires may refer to:
 André Pires (footballer)
 André Pires (motorcyclist)